Great Northern Railway (Ireland) Class RT were set of set of four 0-6-4T tank locomotives designed by Charles Clifford.  The success of the first two in 1908 led to the order for two more in 1911.  They were used for shunting and transfer work around the docks and railways of Belfast.

References

0-6-4T locomotives
Railway locomotives introduced in 1908
5 ft 3 in gauge locomotives
Steam locomotives of Northern Ireland
Steam locomotives of Ireland
RT
Beyer, Peacock locomotives
Scrapped locomotives